Leirvik is a village in Hyllestad Municipality in Vestland county, Norway. The village is located along the inner part of the Bøfjorden, a small fjord off the main Sognefjorden. Havyard Leirvik, the largest municipal business, is a shipyard on the southwest side of Leirvik. The western shore of the fjord is the site of Bø Church.

References

Villages in Vestland
Hyllestad